Anastasia Rybachenko (born 11 September 1991) is a former Russian political and civic activist. She worked as a member of the Political Council, the head of the Youth Committee and a spokesperson with the Moscow branch of the "Solidarnost" movement from 2008 to 2012.

Education 

Rybachenko studied political science at the State Academic University for the Humanities in Moscow. In 2012, she transferred to Tallinn University of Technology and graduated with a major in international relations in 2014. She earned her master's degree from Freie Universität Berlin in 2016.

Political career 
Rybachenko was active in Russian politics from 2008 to 2012, during the period when more liberal Dmitriy Medvedev served as president of Russia. She left Russia after Vladimir Putin took over as president in May 2012.

2008—2012 

In December 2008, Rybachenko joined Solidarnost, a newly founded democratic movement.

In 2009, Rybachenko supported Sergei Davidis, member of the Political Council of Solidarnost, during his run for the 2009 Moscow City Duma election. She worked as a member of his political campaign staff.

In 2010, Rybachenko was elected to the Political Council of Solidarnost's Moscow branch, and became its youngest member aged 18 years old. In 2011, she was re-elected.

Since 2010, Rybachenko represented Solidarnost at the Coordination Committee of the Strategy-31 campaign. The campaign members, among them Solidarnost, the Moscow Helsinki Group, the Memorial human rights centre and the Other Russia party, organized a series of civic protests in support of the right to peaceful assembly guaranteed by Article 31 of the Russian Constitution.

In December 2010, Rybachenko traveled to Minsk to observe the 2010 Belarusian presidential election. After the demonstrations of protest that followed the election, Rybachenko initiated a campaign in Moscow to support the Russian citizens arrested in Belarus. Activists of Solidarnost collected signatures, maintained media campaign and negotiated with the Russian Ministry of Foreign Affairs. The campaigners persuaded the Russian authorities to engage more actively in the cases of two Russian citizens Ivan Gaponov and Artyom Breus, and later on in the case of Belarusian citizen Fedor Mirzayanov, in order to, as activists maintained, represent interests of his father, a citizen of Russia. Gaponov and Breus were released. In the case of Mirzayanov, activists achieved representatives of the Russian embassy in Minsk to observe the trial, but Mirzayanov was nevertheless sentenced to three years in prison.

In March 2011, Rybachenko became the head of the Youth Committee of Solidarnost's Moscow branch. She organized lectures of politicians and other public figures at Moscow universities (Yulia Latynina, Vladimir Ryzhkov, Valery Panyushkin, Mikhail Delyagin, Alexei Navalny and lawyers of Mikhail Khodorkovsky).

In March 2012, Rybachenko became the head of the press office of Solidarnost's Moscow branch. She recruited and trained volunteers for the press office, managed relations with the media representatives, in particular for the campaign of Solidarnost to support Yevgeny Urlashov in the mayoral election in the large Russian city of Yaroslavl.

In 2012, Rybachenko participated in the major Russian protests, including the 6 May 2012 demonstration in the Bolotnaya Square in Moscow. The Bolotnaya square protests disputed the results of the 2012 presidential election, where Vladimir Putin was elected to take over from more liberal president Dmitry Medvedev. Despite protests, Putin was confirmed as president and the government began a crack down on the civil society. In July 2012, Rybachenko left Russia to study abroad.

Emigration 

In September 2012, Rybachenko moved to Estonia. She enrolled at Tallinn University of Technology, where she consequently earned her Bachelor's degree in International Relations. From 2014, Rybachenko studied in Germany at Freie Universität Berlin and earned her Master's degree in 2016.

References

1991 births
Living people
Russian political activists
Tallinn University of Technology alumni